Shahnaz Sheikh (born 21 March 1949) is a retired Pakistani field hockey player. He was born at Sialkot, Pakistan. He is related to Olympians Zahid Sheikh and Tariq Sheikh. In 2014, he was the head coach of Pakistan National Hockey Team.

A forward, Shahnaz Sheikh played between 1969 and 1978. He was capped 68 times and scored 45 goals for the Pakistan National Hockey Team. He won Silver in 1972 and Bronze in 1976 Olympics . Shahnaz won the 1971 Field Hockey World Cup and was runner-up in 1975 and won again in 1978. Shahnaz was one of the most skilled hockey players that Pakistan had produced. At the same time, Shahnaz was also an explosive player who stood tall among his contemporaries and would have easily walked into any field hockey side in the world.
 
Having been given a feminine name, that was the only soft thing about him as he was a marauder on the left wing, and played an 'inner' to Samiullah Khan during the later part of his career. He ran shivers down the spines of opposition defences with his tremendous ball control and situational awareness. To opposing teams, he was a nemesis, virtually unstoppable on his day and more than a handful on several other occasions.

In the early 1970s, he was the most acrobatic Pakistani forward and by the mid-1970s, he had become such a force that his absence from the field through injury was a major cause of the 'Green Shirts' narrowly losing two high-profile matches: the 1975 Hockey World Cup final against India at Kuala Lumpur and the 1976 Montreal Olympics against Australia in the Semis. On both occasions, Pakistan went down 2–1 in controversial circumstances.
Shahnaz also had a 'good hockey head' over his shoulders. One lasting impression of him was his rather brief stint as coach of the Pakistan Junior Team, in which Pakistan won the Junior Asia Cup.

In 2015, Shahnaz Sheikh served as national team coach but stepped down from his post after disappointing performance by Pakistan Hockey Team.

Awards and recognition
 Shahnaz Sheikh is rated among the 'Top 10 Pakistan Hockey Players of All Time'.
 He received the Pride of Performance Award in 1990 from the President of Pakistan.

See also
Pakistan Hockey Federation

References

External links
 

1949 births
Living people
Punjabi people
People from Sialkot
Olympic field hockey players of Pakistan
Pakistani male field hockey players
Field hockey players from Sialkot
Field hockey players at the 1972 Summer Olympics
Field hockey players at the 1976 Summer Olympics
Olympic silver medalists for Pakistan
Olympic bronze medalists for Pakistan
Olympic medalists in field hockey
Recipients of the Pride of Performance
Asian Games medalists in field hockey
Field hockey players at the 1970 Asian Games
Field hockey players at the 1974 Asian Games
Field hockey players at the 1978 Asian Games
Medalists at the 1976 Summer Olympics
Medalists at the 1972 Summer Olympics
Asian Games gold medalists for Pakistan
Medalists at the 1970 Asian Games
Medalists at the 1974 Asian Games
Medalists at the 1978 Asian Games
1978 Men's Hockey World Cup players